Rito d'amore (English: Love Ritual) is a 1989 Italian drama film directed by Aldo Lado.

Plot
The young Valerie is a very determined girl: she wants to become an actress and participates in dozens of auditions, almost always without success. To live (she shares a small apartment with her friend Louise) she also agrees to pose naked at the Institute of Fine Arts, where she meets Yuro, an introverted and disturbing Japanese. Valerie, engaged to a musician, slowly lets herself be involved in Yuro's charm, to the point of accepting all conditions. The two end up estranged from the world and live physically and intellectually united, in a relationship bordering on the pathological. Yuro, taking his philosophy of life to the extreme, ends up killing the girl (who is consenting) and eating her flesh: the last desperate rite of love to live with her always.

Cast
Larry Huckmann: Yuro
Beatrice Ring: Valerie
Francesco Casale: Pierre
Natalia Brizzi: Louise

References

1989 films
1989 drama films
Italian drama films
1980s Italian-language films
Films directed by Aldo Lado
1980s Italian films